Each year from 1871 to 1874 an Annual International Exhibition was held in London. These followed on from the 1851 Great Exhibition of the Works of Industry of All Nations and the 1862 International Exhibition in London, and the many international exhibitions which had been held in various countries since 1851.

The first received over a million visitors and made a profit, but the subsequent three had fewer visitors and all made a loss.

Details of the 1873 Exhibition, officially described as London Annual International Exhibition of all fine arts, industries and inventions,  are quoted in this source.

Colonial Exhibitions  
Colonial contributions to the annual international exhibitions in London were primarily contained in the Queensland annex. In order for the colonies to contribute to the annual international exhibitions in London, there needed to be more space for in order for them to be able to set up their exhibitions. This required the construction of a new building. This new building needed funds in order to be built and to be kept in top condition throughout the years, in the form of  maintenance, hence every colony that would participate in the exhibition within the Queensland Annex would be asked to donate funds based on the amount of their earnings. In the first year, there were only three colonies that took part in the Queensland annex, more precisely the Belgian annex. The three colonies that took part in this were New South Wales, South Australia and Victoria, during the London exhibition in 1873. During the London exhibition in the year 1873, the colonial exhibitions were not primarily focused on presenting recent technological developments of the current year, which was typical of nations during annual exhibitions. Instead the colonial exhibitions favored showing artworks that depicted how the colonies lived and/or were perceived to have lived and their popular exports. This section of the annual international exhibitions in London, that enabled colonies to participate in the exhibitions, known as the Queensland annex continued to remain running until the exhibition itself was no longer open. All of the colonies that held exhibitions in the Queensland annex, after 1873, followed in the footsteps of the first three colonies that held exhibitions and would primarily present artworks about how daily life in the colonies was and their popular exports.

Indian Exhibitions 
Unlike the colonies, India was actually present all four years that the annual international exhibitions in London were active. However, unlike the colonies that depicted the general life of the colonies and kept a similar theme throughout the years, the exhibitions that represented India had a different theme/subject each year. These themes of the India portion of the exhibitions in chronological order were woolens/pottery, jewelry, silks and leather objects. During the London exhibition of 1871 was popular among the general public. In 1872 the exhibition had a theme of showing jewelry from India. The jewelry that was presented was not limited to the jewelry of certain classes of Indian society and instead the exhibition of 1872 showed pieces that were worn by both sexes from all economic classes. The third exhibition, which took place in 1873 was heavily focused on presenting Indian silks. The silks that were shown during the exhibition were both plain and embroidered. During the final year of the international annual exhibition in London, the primary theme of the Indian proportion of the exhibition was leather made objects. However, it is important to note while each year of the annual exhibition that the Indian exhibition did have a theme, the exhibitions representing India were not limited to said themes. In fact, during every annual exhibition there was a large amount of Indian artwork shown. These artworks included ornaments, miniatures, carvings and embroideries, etc... made of inlaid wood, metal works, ivory, onyx. These exhibitions were presented in a location known as an Indian court.

References

World's fairs in London
1870s in London
1871 in London
1872 in London
1873 in London
1874 in London
Festivals established in 1871
1871 festivals
1872 festivals
1873 festivals
1874 festivals
1871 establishments in England